HMS Sheffield is a Type 22 frigate originally in service with the British Royal Navy. Initially it was meant to be called Bruiser but was named Sheffield in honour of the previous , a Type 42 destroyer sunk in the Falklands War. Entering service in 1988, Sheffield served with the Royal Navy until 2002. In 2003, the vessel was acquired by the Chilean Navy and renamed Almirante Williams. The frigate is currently in service with the Chilean Navy.

History
Sheffield was launched on 26 March 1986, by Swan Hunter, Tyne and Wear, United Kingdom, and named by Mrs Susan Stanley, wife of the then Armed Forces Minister. The ship was commissioned at Hull on 26 July 1988. Several crewmen of the previous Sheffield were at the launch. A specially minted Sheffield coin was placed in the keel at the keel-laying ceremony on 29 March 1984.

In late 1998, Sheffield provided assistance after Hurricane Georges, visiting the island of St Kitts and also saved a Honduran woman who had been swept out to sea from her home by the force of Hurricane Mitch.

May 2000 saw Sheffield deployed on an eight-week deployment into the Baltic Sea, which included a two-week BALTOPS 2000 – France, Germany, Sweden, Denmark, United States, Poland, Estonia, Lithuania, Latvia and the Netherlands all contributed ships to the exercise, which involved aspects of search and rescue as well as military joint exercises. Sheffield later visited Kiel, then Gdynia, the Twin city of Plymouth, with the Lord Mayor of Plymouth before visiting St. Petersburg in Russia.  Sheffield visited Kotka in Finland before Klaipėda in Lithuania, as the first major British warship to visit the city. Sheffield returned home on 26 July.

8 February 2001 saw Sheffield, under Commander Simon Williams, deployed to the Caribbean for a six-month deployment. Sheffield was deployed to assist the United States Coast Guard, Dutch, French and Venezuelan navies in anti-drug operations and exercises. There were visits to the US as well as Barbados, Trinidad, Antigua, St Lucia, Curaçao and the Bahamas. Sheffield took part in Exercise Tradewinds, which promoted interoperability between coastguards and law enforcement agencies in the area. Other ships in the exercise included  and RFA Gold Rover.

5 February 2002 saw Sheffield deployed to the Standing Naval Force Mediterranean to replace . The mission was anti-terrorism by monitoring merchant shipping. There were also visits to Turkey, Sicily, Crete, Spain and Algiers. Sheffield was the flagship of Commodore Angus Somerville.  Tuesday 26 February saw Sheffield assist the Spanish submarine , whilst participating in the exercise DOGFISH 2002. The submarine needed medicines for a sailor whilst in the Ionian Sea.

On 11 October 2002 Sheffield visited Kingston upon Hull one last time so that she could be visited by the people of her namesake city of Sheffield.

Sheffield was decommissioned on 4 November 2002. After 14 years service, which included providing humanitarian assistance to Nicaragua and Honduras after Hurricane Mitch (which earned her the Wilkinson Sword of Peace along with ), the Strategic Defence Review of 1998 (updated 2001) saw the end of her career.

Chilean service

Sheffield was sold to Chile on 4 September 2003 and renamed Almirante Williams in honour of Juan Williams Rebolledo.  She received a major refit in 2008, which saw her weapons fit change to:-
 1 x 76mm gun
 2 x 20mm Oerlikon cannon
 8 x Harpoon anti-ship missiles
 2 x Barak 1 point defence systems
 2 x triple 324mm ASW torpedo tubes
 Embarkation of 1 x SH-32 Cougar ASW helicopter

The new equipment was retrieved from decommissioned County-class destroyers.

Notes

References
 HMS Sheffield Type 22 Frigate (Batch 2A) guide. Directorate of Public Relations (Royal Navy). Printed in UK for HMSO by Roman Press Ltd, Bournemouth. Crown Copyright 1994, London.
 Devonport Navy Days guide 1999

Further reading
  .

External links

 HMS Sheffield Association Website
 Sources for the study of HMS Sheffield, Sheffield City Council's Libraries and Archives

1986 ships
Type 22 frigates of the Royal Navy
Ships built by Swan Hunter
Ships built on the River Tyne
Type 22 frigates of the Chilean Navy